KCPK-LP is a low-power FM community radio station located in Pine Mountain Club, California. The station, which is licensed to California Family Counseling Network, Inc., broadcasts a variety format on 106.9 MHz. It went on the air on March 20, 2014.

References

External links

2014 establishments in California
Radio stations established in 2014
Community radio stations in the United States
Variety radio stations in the United States
Mass media in Kern County, California
CPK-LP
CPK-LP